The 2002–03 season was Burnley's 3rd season in the second tier of English football. They were managed by Stan Ternent in his fifth full season since he replaced Chris Waddle at the beginning 1998–99 campaign.

Season summary
Four straight losses at the beginning of the season saw Burnley bottom of the First Division, before a ten-match unbeaten run lifted the Clarets to the brink of the play-off places. However, that would be as good as it got for the Lancashire club, who spent most of the season hovering in mid-table. A poor finish to the season - 10 losses in the club's final 14 matches - saw them fall to 16th. Burnley's downfall was their poor defence, which was the worst in the league: 5 goals conceded against both Grimsby and Reading, 6 against Rotherham, 7 against Sheffield Wednesday and Watford, and 89 overall, the worst in the First Division and third-worst in the entire Football League.

Appearances and goals
	
	
	
	

	
	

		
	
		

	

|}

Transfers

In

Out

Results

First Division

Final league position

League Cup

FA Cup

References

Burnley F.C. seasons
Burnley